Badlapur is an administrative division in Jaunpur District in the Indian state of Uttar Pradesh. It was accorded the status of Town Area Nagar Panchayat on 27 June 2014.

Geography
It has been assigned 222 125 pin code by India Post.

Demographics
As of the 2001 Census of India, Badlapur had a population of 36,943. Males constitute 51% of the population and females 49%. Machhlishahr has an average literacy rate of 59%, male literacy is 76.99%, and female literacy is 43.35%. In Machhlishahr, 18% of the population is under 6 years of age. Represented in the U.P. State Assembly by MLA Subhash Pandey of the BSP.

Transportation

Rail

Badlapur is connected with major cities of India through the Indian Railways network. It has station named Sri Krishna Nagar. Some important trains from Sri Krishna Nagar are the Varuna Express to Lucknow  Varanasi, Kanpur, the Howrah - Amritsar Express connecting Kolkata and Amritsar, Sadbhavana Express connecting Raxaul and Delhi and the Farakka Express to Delhi.

Road
Badlapur is connected to Lucknow, Varanasi, Allahabad and other cities of Uttar Pradesh. National Highway 731(NH-731) links Badlapur to Lucknow and Varanasi. State Highway 7(SH-7) is highway connecting Badlapur to Allahabad and Gorakhpur.

Festivals
The biggest annual celebrations in Badlapur are Durga Puja, Ram Lila and Bharat Milap. People also organise big celebrations on  Holi, Diwali, Raksha Bandhan and other occasions. Also, fireworks exhibitions are performed on Independence Day and Republic Day.

See also
Saraiharkhu

References

Cities and towns in Jaunpur district

bpy:বদলাপুর
it:Badlapur
mr:बदलापूर
new:बदलापूर
sv:Badlapur
vi:Badlapur